3 Doors Down is the fourth studio album by American rock band 3 Doors Down, released on May 20, 2008. "It's Not My Time" was the first single from the album and was released in February 2008. Another song on the album, "Citizen/Soldier" was released in 2007 as a tribute to the National Guard.

The album became the band's second consecutive number-one album on the Billboard 200, debuting at the top position with first week sales of 154,000. 3 Doors Down was certified Gold by the RIAA on June 26, 2008, and as of November 2009, it has sold 820,000 copies in the US. It is their first album to feature Greg Upchurch on drums.

Track listing

Personnel

3 Doors Down
 Brad Arnold – lead vocals
 Matt Roberts – lead guitar, backing vocals
 Chris Henderson – rhythm guitar, backing vocals
 Todd Harrell – bass
 Greg Upchurch – drums

Additional musicians
 David Davidson, David Angell, John Catchings and Kris Wilkinson – strings
 Kris Wilkinson - strings arrangement

Production
 Johnny K – producer, engineering, strings
 Kirk Kelsey – engineering, digital editing, additional production
 Andy Wallace – mixing at East Iris Recording Studio, Nashville, TN (assisted by John O'Mahoney)
 George Marino – mastering at Sterling Sound, New York, NY
 Heather Sturm and Mike Paragone – engineering
 Steve Beers – assistant engineering
 Doug Sonders (DSp) – cover photo, staff photography
 Chapman Baehler – additional photographs
 Sandy Brummels – creative direction
 Christopher Kornmann – art direction and design at Spit and Image, NYC

Charts

Weekly charts

Year end charts

Certifications and sales

References

External links

3 Doors Down albums
2008 albums
Universal Records albums
Albums produced by Johnny K